The Monteverdi Hai 450 SS was a mid-engined prototype, an attempt to create a full sports car complementing the company's High Speed line. It was intended to be a direct competitor to the top of the list super sports cars of Lamborghini, Ferrari and Maserati.

History

A magenta Hai 450 SS prototype debuted at the 1970 Geneva Auto Show. It had a  V8 from Chrysler positioned behind the two front seats. It took its name from the output of the engine, and the German word for shark, Hai. The body was presumably designed by Trevor Fiore, of Carrozzeria Fissore, although some sources credit Pietro Frua. A second car was made with a longer wheelbase and minor detail changes like door handles and red bodywork. This car was named the Hai 450 GTS to mark the changes.

Monteverdi initially planned to produce 49 copies, but the production was halted after the two prototypes. Only one car was actually sold, although in a 1974 interview Peter Monteverdi claimed to have delivered eleven of the cars. In the 1990s, two additional replicas from spare parts were made by Monteverdi, those now reside in the Swiss National Transport Museum in Luzern.

The Hai had large parts commonality with Monteverdi's front-engined cars, meaning that a large number of Chrysler parts were used. It has the same de Dion rear axle as the 375 High Speed, and may be the only mid-engined car ever to have used a recirculating ball steering setup.

Specifications

References

The Observer's Book of Automobiles Frederick Warne & Co (1978) 

Monteverdi vehicles
Rear mid-engine, rear-wheel-drive vehicles
Cars introduced in 1970
Cars discontinued in 1973